Peter Shawn Chilcutt (born September 14, 1968) is a retired American professional basketball player who played in the National Basketball Association (NBA).

Born in Sumter, South Carolina, Chilcutt attended Tuscaloosa Academy in Tuscaloosa, Alabama. He was recruited by a number of schools, and decided to go to University of North Carolina at Chapel Hill. Following a collegiate basketball career at North Carolina, he was selected as a first-round NBA Draft pick in 1991 by the Sacramento Kings.

Chilcutt played forward for seven teams over a nine-year professional career that spanned from the 1991–92 to the 1999–2000 season. He won an NBA Championship in the 1994–95 season with the Houston Rockets, for whom he played from 1994 to 1996. He also played for the Detroit Pistons, Vancouver Grizzlies, Los Angeles Clippers, Cleveland Cavaliers, and Utah Jazz.

Post-basketball career
After his basketball career, Chilcutt spent time as a sixth-grade math and science teacher at Folsom Middle School in Folsom, California. Pete also founded a basketball academy in the Greater Sacramento area called Clutch City Basketball Academy.

References

External links
ClutchFans.net Pete Chilcutt Profile - Houston Rocket Fan Site
NBA.com player profile
Clutch City Basketball Academy

1968 births
Living people
American expatriate basketball people in Canada
American expatriate basketball people in Italy
American men's basketball players
Basketball players from South Carolina
Cleveland Cavaliers players
Detroit Pistons players
Houston Rockets players
Los Angeles Clippers players
McDonald's High School All-Americans
North Carolina Tar Heels men's basketball players
Parade High School All-Americans (boys' basketball)
People from Folsom, California
Sportspeople from Sumter, South Carolina
Power forwards (basketball)
Sacramento Kings draft picks
Sacramento Kings players
Utah Jazz players
Vancouver Grizzlies players